Christine Sotto Jacob-Sandejas (born April 30, 1967) known professionally as Christine Jacob, is a Filipina swimmer, actress, TV host, and newscaster.

Early life
She was born in Manila, Philippines to a German American father George Jacob and a former TV host Rosemarie (née Sotto), and grew up in the United States in her elementary years.

Biography
Her parents are the ones behind her swimming talent. She and her family returned to the Philippines in 1980s and she joined Southeast Asian Games in Singapore in 1983, and then competed in the swimming competition in the 1984 Summer Olympics. After joining athletics, she was requested by her aunt to co-host in Eat Bulaga! in 1990 (then airing on ABS-CBN) as her aunt knew that Christine's mother was also a TV host. She became a news caster for PTV while hosting Eat Bulaga!, where she had a short-lived relationship with the main host Mr. Vic Sotto (no blood relationship to Christine's mother). After her contract with APT Entertainment and TAPE Inc. (producer of Eat Bulaga!) expired, Christine hosted its rival, Magandang Tanghali Bayan, in ABS-CBN (Eat Bulaga is already airing in GMA Network). She stopped hosting in showbiz in 2001 when she got pregnant with her first child with husband, Francisco "Paco" Sandejas, the brother of Manu Sandejas (Agot Isidro's husband). After 4 years, GMA Network gave her her very own TV show Mobile Kusina as GMA knew that she came from the longest-running noontime show Eat Bulaga! which GMA co-produces. This show ended in early 2007.

Filmography

Film
Rocky Plus V (Regal Films and M-Zet Productions) as Lorna
Kuya Kong Siga (Regal Films and M-Zet Productions) as Jessica

Television

Awards
1991 PMPC Star Awards for Television "Best New TV Personality" (Eat Bulaga! / ABS-CBN 2)
2006 PMPC Star Awards for Television "Best Educational Show Host" (Mobile Kusina / GMA 7)

External links

References

1967 births
Living people
ABS-CBN personalities
Actresses from Manila
CNN people
Competitors at the 1983 Southeast Asian Games
Female backstroke swimmers
Filipino female swimmers
Filipino people of American descent
Filipino people of German descent
GMA Network personalities
Olympic swimmers of the Philippines
Southeast Asian Games bronze medalists for the Philippines
Southeast Asian Games medalists in swimming
Southeast Asian Games silver medalists for the Philippines
Sportspeople from Manila
Swimmers at the 1984 Summer Olympics